The Germantown Township Bridge S-29 is a historic stone arch bridge over an unnamed stream on 278th Street in rural Turner County, South Dakota, southwest of Chancellor.   Built in 1942, it is one of a modest number of bridges surviving in the county that was built with New Deal funding.  It was listed on the National Register of Historic Places in 2000.

Description and history
It carries 278th Street, a rural paved road, across an unnamed stream between 459th and 460th Avenues. A stone nose projects away from the arches on one side of the structure. It is built out of heavily mortared local quartzite and granite fieldstone.

This bridge is one of 180 stone arch bridges built in Turner County as part of a New Deal-era federal jobs program. The county administration was able to build stone bridges at a lower cost than then-conventional steel beam bridges because of the availability of experienced stone workers, and the federal subsidy to the wages they were paid. The county was responsible for supervising the work crews and providing the building materials. This bridge was built in 1942 by a county crew to a standardized state design.

See also
National Register of Historic Places listings in Turner County, South Dakota
List of bridges on the National Register of Historic Places in South Dakota

References

Bridges on the National Register of Historic Places in South Dakota
National Register of Historic Places in Turner County, South Dakota
Bridges completed in 1942
Transportation in Turner County, South Dakota
Buildings and structures in Turner County, South Dakota
1942 establishments in South Dakota